Sanary-sur-Mer (literally Sanary on Sea), popularly known as Sanary, is a commune in the Var department in the Provence-Alpes-Côte d'Azur region, Southeastern France. In 2018, it had a population of 16,696. It can be reached from Paris by TGV in less than four hours. In high season there are direct flights to nearby Toulon–Hyères Airport from London, Oslo, Brussels and Rotterdam.

History
The seafront location was part of the commune of Ollioules. In the 16th century the seigneur established a fishing village here, clustered around the medieval watchtower, under the protection of "Sanct Nazari" of Lérins Abbey. The port was constructed and the harbour deepened in the mid-16th century. The little fishing port known in the Provençal dialect of Occitan (or in Provençal if considered as a distinct language) as Sant Nazari, later Sant Nàri, contracted later on as Sanàri, was finally granted its independence from Ollioules by Louis XIV of France on 10 July 1688. On 12 November 1890 it officially received its Francised name, Sanary, which was formalised and distinguished as "sur-Mer" ("on Sea") on 27 July 1923.

As a tourist rendezvous, the village underwent a strong decade of growth in the 1980s. Sanary-sur-Mer's coastline has a number of small beaches; it is an active village all year round, unlike most small towns on the Mediterranean coast. Sanary-sur-Mer is one of the sunniest places in France, with an average of only 61 days of rain, mostly in winter, as well as major solar radiation (6,156 MJ/m2/yr), comparable to Sicily. Wind is near gale force or higher on average 115 days per year (storm force eight days per year), making Sanary a favourite destination for windsurfers.

Population

Main sights
Chapelle Notre-Dame-de-Pitié: From this chapel built in 1560 on a headland west of the town, the visitor sees a broad view over the bay of Sanary. It has a large number of ex-voto votive offerings. 
Église Saint Nazaire: A Gothic Revival church of the late 19th century, Michel Pacha, architect.
Tour romane: A medieval construction, circa 1300.
Port: Sanary has a large collection of traditional wooden fishing boats, mainly the local "pointus". It also has a small fleet of artisan fishermen, who sell their catch every morning.
Portissol: The nicest beach in Sanary.
Market: Every morning there is a Provençal market under the plane trees, with much fresh produce.

Jacques Cousteau had a house in Sanary, the Villa Baobab. He was a pioneer of deep sea diving equipment, which he invented and developed around Sanary. The Frédéric Dumas International Diving Museum (Musée Frédéric-Dumas) is in a 13th-century Romanesque tower made available by the municipality; it bills itself as an historical city of diving. Frédéric Dumas was a co-inventor with Cousteau of the aqua-lung.

Sanary was the birthplace of Ernest Blanc (1923–2010), a distinguished operatic baritone who enjoyed a long international career.

Sanary hosts every year during the month of May the prestigious international photography festival PHOTOMED, now also held in parallel in Beirut.

Literary Sanary

With the rise of Nazism in the early 1930s, a great number of German writers and intellectuals left Germany and settled here: the playwright Bertold Brecht, Egon Erwin Kisch, Thomas Mann, Ludwig Marcuse, Joseph Roth, Franz Werfel and his wife Alma Mahler widow of Gustav Mahler at Le Moulin Gris (near the Chapelle Notre-Dame-de-Pitié), Lion Feuchtwanger at Villa Lazare then at Villa Valmer, and Arnold Zweig. Patronised by Jean Cocteau and his coterie, Sanary had already drawn Aldous Huxley, who wrote Brave New World at Villa Huley, and his wife, Maria; they attracted other English visitors, such as D. H. Lawrence and his wife, Frieda; Julian Huxley and his wife, Juliette; and others. The German expatriates clustered around Thomas Mann and his large family, his brother Heinrich and his wife (the model for Blue Angel), the writers Stefan Zweig and Arnold Zweig, the art critic Julius Meier-Graefe, and the artist René Schickele. Sybille von Schoenebeck (later, as Sybille Bedford, the author of A Legacy) lived here with her mother. Ludwig Marcuse in his book "Mein Zwanzigstes Jahrhundert" (p. 160) wrote about Sanary: "Wir wohnten im Paradies – notgedrungen", meaning "We lived in paradise – against our will".

"If one lives in exile," wrote  Hermann Kesten, "The café becomes at once the family home, the nation, church and parliament, a desert and a place of pilgrimage, cradle of illusions and their cemetery... In exile, the café is the one place where life goes on."

With the declaration of war in 1939, the French government treated these exiles as enemy aliens and interned some of them in camps like the concentration Camp des Milles near Aix-en-Provence, and eventually some were sent to Auschwitz. After the liberation of France, the whole episode went ignored until the 1990s when, perhaps thanks to the increasing number of tourists from Germany, a commemorative plaque was unveiled, and literary itineraries were signposted.

International relations

Sanary-sur-Mer is twinned with:
 Luino, Italy, since 2001
 Bad Säckingen, Germany, since 1973
 Purkersdorf, Austria, since 1973
 Kościerzyna, Poland, since 1990
 Noginsk, Russia, since 2010

See also
Communes of the Var department

Bibliography 
 German Writers in French Exile, 1933–1940, by Martin Mauthner (London: 2007), .

References

External links

Official site
2000 pictures, history, agenda
Independent site
Info site
The Independent obituary of Sybille Bedford, February 20, 2006
Independent site
Pointu boats in Sanary

Communes of Var (department)
French Riviera